Afshin Sadeghi (born 25 March 1993) is an Iranian handball player for Mes Kerman and the Iranian national team.

References

1993 births
Living people
Iranian male handball players
Place of birth missing (living people)
Iranian expatriate sportspeople in Turkey
Handball players at the 2018 Asian Games
21st-century Iranian people